"Teenage Frankenstein" is the second single by American musician Alice Cooper from his 1986 album Constrictor. Though the single failed to chart, it helped to make Constrictor Cooper's highest charting album since 1980's Flush the Fashion.

Along with two other Alice Cooper songs, "He's Back (The Man Behind the Mask)" and "Hard Rock Summer" (which was not featured on "Constrictor"), "Teenage Frankenstein" was written to be featured as part of the soundtrack to the horror film Friday the 13th Part VI: Jason Lives.

The 7" single featured a "live" version of "School's Out" as its B-side. The 12" single featured "School's Out (Recorded Live)" as well as a "live" version of "Only Women Bleed". Both versions were in fact originally recorded in the studio for the Alice Cooper a Paris TV special in 1982 during the Special Forces era, which were remixed in January 1987 with crowd noise to resemble "live" recordings.

The song was written by Alice Cooper and Kane Roberts.

Music video
A music video of Cooper performing the song live in concert was used to promote the single. This is footage of a compilation of material from The Nightmare Returns concert video.

Track listing
"Teenage Frankenstein"
"School's Out (Live)"
"Only Women Bleed (Live)"

Album appearances
Constrictor
Prince of Darkness
The Life and Crimes of Alice Cooper

1986 singles
Songs written by Alice Cooper
Alice Cooper songs
Friday the 13th (franchise) music
Songs written for films
Songs about Frankenstein's monster
1986 songs
MCA Records singles
Songs written by Kane Roberts
 Glam metal songs